Lifeline is the second and final studio album by Manchester band The Answering Machine. It was released on 21 February 2011 in the United Kingdom on Heist or Hit Records.

Track listing

Personnel
Martin Colclough - Vocals, guitar
Pat Fogarty - Guitar, backing vocals
Gemma Evans - Bass, backing vocals
Ben Perry - Drums, glockenspiel

References

External links 

 

2011 albums